The Anarchistic Pogo Party of Germany (German: Anarchistische Pogo-Partei Deutschlands, or 'APPD') is the self-declared party of the Pöbel (mob) and "social parasites". It was created in 1981 by two punks in Hannover and took part in the 1998 election to the Bundestag with the promise to pay the voters with free beer. The official communication organ is the paper Armes Deutschland ("Poor Germany"), formerly Asoziale Rundschau ("Asocial Review"). The name refers to the punk dance, the Pogo.

The party took part in the 2005 German federal election with their chancellor candidate Wolfgang Wendland, who is also the lead singer of the German punk-band "Die Kassierer" ("The Cashiers"). The party has also been barred from elections for formal reasons.

Aims
 Right to unemployment with full salary
 Youth pension instead of retirement pension
 Abolishment of compulsory education
 Creation of centers for physical love, so-called Mitfickzentralen (literally "fuckpooling centers")
 Abolition of police
 Legalization of all drugs
 Abolition of the right to demonstrate with prior announcement (abolition of distinction between permitted and not permitted)
 Totale Rückverdummung ("total restupidification") and balkanization of Germany
 Reconstitute the German borders from 1237 (a satire on the aim of some German extreme-right parties to restore the German borders during the time of Nazism and World War II, or World War I)

History

The party was founded in 1981 by two 17-year-olds with the nicknames "Zewa" (a leading paper towel brand) and "Kotze" (vomit). In the following years it was joined by many punks and organized many demonstrations, which were sometimes ended by the police, often leading to arrests. The party was dissolved in 1986, but was recreated in 1994 and soon chose to participate in elections. 
In the 1997 Hamburg city elections the APPD received a stunning 5.3% of the votes in  St. Pauli and thus became the fourth-strongest party in that district. In 1998 the APPD ran in the Bundestag election with Karl Nagel as its candidate for the chancellorship, and using slogans like "Work sucks" ("Arbeit ist Scheiße") and "Drinking, drinking, every day just drinking" ("Saufen! Saufen! Jeden Tag nur saufen"). The APPD failed, however, to gain the 0.5% of the votes needed to pay to the voters in the form of a promised large party with free beer.  With approximately 35,000, or 0.1%, of the votes, the APPD outperformed Lyndon LaRouche's "BüSo" and also the German Communist Party DKP. Finally the party was dissolved in 1999. In December 2000 the APPD was reestablished in Munich, but did not participate in the Bundestag election of 2002. A sufficient number of signatures were collected for participation in the European election 2004, however these did not arrive because the German Postal Service declined to forward them to party chairman Christoph Grossmann. In the following year, the APPD took part in the Bundestag election of 2005 with little success. As a result, the party split into two parties in 2006 - the APPD and the Pogo-Partei. The Pogo-Partei merged with others into the joke party Die Partei. The APPD elected a new chairman, Volker Stoi, and took part in Berlin elections 2011 with little success.

Theory of pogo-anarchism 

The concept of Balkanisation is introduced to split up the country into different parts:

"Asoziale Parasiten-Zonen" (APZ, asocial parasite zone) for pogo-anarchists and other asocials, who prefer not to work and rather drink, use drugs and have sex.
"Sichere Beschäftigungs-Zonen" (SBZ, safe employment zone) for strait-laced workaholics who will finance the good life of the people in the APZ. This is a pun, since the SBZ in West-German use (used until late into the Willy Brandt-era by the conservative press) meant the Sowjetisch besetzte Zone (Soviet Occupied Zone) or Sowjetische Besatzungszone (Soviet Occupation Zone), the predecessor of the GDR.
"Gewalt-Erlebnis-Parks" (GEP, violence theme parks) for incurable violent offenders, cops and Nazis with special areas set aside as ethnic theme parks for cultural minorities (such as lederhosen-wearing Bavarians), to avoid too close contact between these pogo races lest the pursuit of what each considers necessary for happiness suffers. These parks will be surrounded by very high walls and are located in former East Germany.

The APPD propagated the idea of a "youth pension", to replace the existing old-age pension. The idea was that people should enjoy life first, and work later.

They claim that pogo-anarchism has "nothing to do" with anarchism.

Slogans 

Politik ist Scheiße! = Politics is shit!

Schule ist Scheiße! = School is shit!

Dumm und glücklich! = Dumb and happy!

Asoziale an die Macht! = Asocials to power!

Arbeit ist Scheiße! = Work is shit!

Scheißen ist Arbeit! = Shitting is work!

Fick Heil! = Hail Fuck! (see: Sieg Heil)

Meine Stimme für den Müll! = My vote for the trash!

Saufen, saufen, jeden Tag nur saufen! = Boozing, boozing, every day nothing but boozing!

See also
Anarcho-punk
List of political parties in Germany
List of frivolous political parties

References

External links 

 APPD-Berlin website

Anarchist organisations in Germany
Anarchist political parties
Joke political parties in Germany
Political parties established in 1981
1981 establishments in West Germany
Political parties disestablished in 2006
2006 disestablishments in Germany